"Wie schön du bist" is a song by German recording artist Sarah Connor. It was written and produced by Connor along with Peter Plate, Ulf Leo Sommer, and Daniel Faust for her ninth studio album Muttersprache (2015). An ode to her son Tyler, the uplifting pop ballad was conceived after a dispute with him. Her first single in German, the song was released as the album's lead single on 1 May 2015 in German-speaking Europe; it has since reached number two on the German Singles Chart.

Chart performance
In Germany, "Wie schön du bist" was certified gold by the Bundesverband Musikindustrie (BVMI), denoting sales/streams of 260,000 copies, including 240,000 digital downloads.

Formats and track listings

Charts

Weekly charts

Year-end charts

Certifications

Parody
In September 2015, German comedian Carolin Kebekus performed a parody of this song in her show 
PussyTerror TV, mocking dim-witted German nationalists under the title "Wie blöd du bist".

References

2010s ballads
2015 singles
2015 songs
German-language songs
Polydor Records singles
Sarah Connor (singer) songs
Songs written by Peter Plate
Songs written by Sarah Connor (singer)
Songs written by Ulf Leo Sommer